Uncial 0136 (in the Gregory-Aland numbering), ε 91 (Soden), is a Greek-Arabic diglot uncial manuscript of the New Testament, dated palaeographically to the 9th century. Formerly it was labelled by Θh.

Description 
The codex contains a small part of the Gospel of Matthew 14:6-13; 25:9-16; 25:41-26:1, on 3 parchment leaves (33 cm by 27 cm). It is written in two columns per page, 16 lines per page, in large uncial letters.

It has breathings and accents.

The codex was taken from Sinai and now is located in the National Library of Russia (Gr. 281) in Saint Petersburg. 

The manuscript 0136 was part of the same codex to which Uncial 0137 belonged. They were divided in the 19th century and catalogued under different numbers. Uncial 0137 contains Matt. 13:46-52. It is Greek-Arabic diglot. It was found by Rendel Harris at Sinai.

Currently it is dated by the INTF to the 9th century.

Uncial 0137 is still located in Sinai Harris 9 in the Saint Catherine's Monastery in Mount Sinai in Egypt.

The Greek text of this codex is a representative of the Byzantine text-type. Aland placed it in Category V.

See also 
 List of New Testament uncials
 Textual criticism

References

Further reading 
 J. Rendel Harris, Biblical fragments from Mount Sinai (London, 1890), pp. 25, 26. 
 Hermann von Soden, "Die Schriften des Neuen Testaments, in ihrer ältesten erreichbaren Textgestalt hergestellt auf Grund ihrer Textgeschichte," Verlag von Arthur Glaue, Berlin 1902, p. 89. 
 Kurt Treu, Die Griechischen Handschriften des Neuen Testaments in der UdSSR; eine systematische Auswertung des Texthandschriften in Leningrad, Moskau, Kiev, Odessa, Tbilisi und Erevan, T & U 91 (Berlin, 1966), pp. 116-117.

Greek New Testament uncials
9th-century biblical manuscripts